The Tweed Run is a group bicycle living history ride through the centre of London, in which the cyclists are expected to dress in retro style traditional British cycling attire, particularly tweed plus four suits. Any bicycle is acceptable on the Tweed Run, but classic vintage bicycles are encouraged. Some effort to recreate the spirit of a bygone era is always appreciated. The ride dubs itself "A Metropolitan Cycle Ride With a Bit of Style."

Inspirations
Among the inspirations for the Tweed Run was Jack Thurston's now disbanded Tweed Cycling Club, and several vintage attire-themed rides which were held in the north of England in the 1990s.

First Tweed Run
Although previous cycling clubs have hosted vintage-themed rides before, the very first Tweed Run  was held on 24 January 2009, and organised by Ted Young-Ing  and Jacqueline Shannon via London Fixed Gear and Single Speed, an online cycling forum.  The second run was held on 10 April 2010, for 500 registered riders.

Since then the Tweed Run has become an annual event with major sponsors. Participants were limited to 500 (due to health and safety rules) but by 2018 the numbers had increased to 1000 and due to high and popular demand a ticket ballot system had been in place but are now sold on a first come first served basis often selling out very quickly.

Gallery of 2013 event in London

Gallery of event in Melk (Austria)

See also

Bike bus
 Clothing-optional bike rides
 Critical Mass
Cycle touring
 Outline of cycling

References

External links

Tweed Run official website

Cycling in London
Cycling events in the United Kingdom
Cycling clothing
Historically themed events
History of transport events